Stories Untold may refer to:
 Stories Untold (album), an album by JJ Lin
 Stories Untold (video game), a 2017 episodic horror adventure game